Kevin Krawietz and Albano Olivetti were the defending champions but lost in the first round to Aliaksandr Bury and Andreas Siljeström.

Sander Arends and Roman Jebavý won the title after defeating Ken and Neal Skupski 6–2, 6–4 in the final.

Seeds

Draw

References
 Main Draw

Bauer Watertechnology Cup - Doubles
2017 Doubles